Tara Bhusan Dahal (born 18 May 1966) is a Nepali television personality, music video director, film director and media personality based in Nepal; he has been active in the Nepali television industry since 1988. He is most noted for his contribution to the Nepali television and video industry, and is also well known for his movie Kagbeni, where he made his directorial debut after making notable music videos, documentaries and features.

Dahal has directed music videos for hundreds of Nepali singers, including Nima Rumba, Ram Krishna Dhakal, Rajesh Payal Rai, 1974 AD, Om Bikram Bista, Yogeswor Amatya, Nhyoo Bajracharya to name a few and the most exotic SAA KARNALI for Nepathya.

During 1988-1990 he anchored Sunday Pop, a program of international pop music on Nepal Television (NTV); he initiated Disha Nirdesh, a political program run on NTV anchored by Bijay Kumar, and hosted Fireside, a current affairs talk show on Kantipur Television, from 2003-2019. He also created a well-known Nepali TV Series called Hamro Team in 2011. 

Dahal served Nepal Television as a beginner and was the first executive producer for Image Channel, executive director for Dibyadristi, his own television production venture in Nepal, before joining Kantipur Television as the chief executive producer. His latest show The Bravo Delta Show appears on AP1 HD  television network on Wednesdays at 9pm.

References

External links
Profile at OurNepal.com
Profile at Fursad.com

Living people
1966 births
Nepalese musicians